Jason Willan is a retired American soccer player who played professionally in the USL A-League and the National Professional Soccer League.  He was the 1996 NPSL Rookie of the Year.

Willan graduated from Franklin High School.  Growing up, he played for the Milwaukee Sport Club and Croatian Eagles.  In 1995, Willan signed with the Detroit Rockers of the National Professional Soccer League.  After scoring forty goals in thirty-four games, Willan was selected as the 1996 NPSL Rookie of the Year.  Willan played for the Rockers until 1998.  That year, he moved to the Milwaukee Wave.  By that time, he was also playing outdoor soccer for the Milwaukee Rampage of the USL A-League.  In October 1999, Willan was arrested for third drunk driving incident in a year.  He was sentenced to 150 days confinement, forcing him to miss a handful of games for both the Wave and Rampage.  However, the judge eventually allowed him a work-release program which allowed him to resume his career while also serving his jail time.  Willan went on to play twenty-six games for the Rampage that season.  In 2001, he played two games for the Rampage before being released by the team on May 5, 2001 for “conduct detrimental to the success of this franchise”.  The Wave also released him after he appeared in only thirteen games, scoring only two goals during the 2000-2001 NPSL season.  In 1999, Willan had begun to train and play with the Croatian Eagles of Milwaukee when not with his professional clubs.  He would continue to do so until 2013.  In 2003, he finished his professional career with the Minnesota Thunder of the USL A-League.

References

Living people
1971 births
American soccer players
Detroit Rockers players
Milwaukee Rampage players
Milwaukee Wave players
Minnesota Thunder players
National Professional Soccer League (1984–2001) players
USISL Select League players
A-League (1995–2004) players
Association football midfielders